Conte de l'Incroyable Amour (The Incredible Tale of Love) is an album by Tunisian oud player Anouar Brahem recorded in 1991 and released on the ECM label.

Reception
The Allmusic review by Stephen Cook awarded the album 3 stars calling it "A wonderful album that, upon repeated listening, reveals many transcendent moments"

Track listing
All compositions by Anouar Brahem except as indicated
 "Etincelles" - 3:21 
 "Le chien sur les genoux de la devineresse" - 3:44 
 "L'oiseau de bois" - 4:48 
 "Lumière du silence" - 5:15 
 "Conte de l'incroyable amour" - 10:51 
 "Peshrev Hidjaz Homayoun" (Veli Dede) - 5:03 
 "Diversion" (Kudsi Erguner) - 5:39 
 "Nayzak" - 5:32 
 "Battements" - 1:56 
 "En souvenir d'Iram" - 3:02 
 "Iram retrouvée" - 3:48 
 "Epilogue" - 6:21 
Recorded at Rainbow Studio in Oslo, Norway in October 1991

Personnel
Anouar Brahem - oud
Barbaros Erköse - clarinet
Kudsi Erguner - ney
Lassad Hosni - bendir, darbouka

References

1992 albums
ECM Records albums
Anouar Brahem albums
Albums produced by Manfred Eicher